Maximum Groove is the third studio album by Japanese dance unit, MAX. It was released on December 2, 1998 by record label, avex trax. It is their second album to peak at the #1 position on the Oricon Weekly Album Charts and has since been certified a million seller by the Recording Industry Association of Japan. It is one of two albums by the group to chart in Oricon's 1999 Year-End album chart along with their first greatest hits compilation, Maximum Collection (1999). It charted at #27. The album was supported by their MAX Live Contact 1999 ~Sunny Holiday~ concert tour.

Track list

Chart performance

Certification 
"Maximum Groove" has been certified million for shipments of over 1,000,000 by the Recording Industry Association of Japan.

Accolades 
 Pop Album of the Year - Japan Gold Disc Awards

References 

MAX (band) albums
1998 albums
Avex Group albums